Tisir Ahmed Al-Antaif (born February 16, 1974, in Dammam) is a Saudi Arabian footballer playing in the goalkeeper role.

He played for Al-Ittifaq at club level and for the national team at the 1998 FIFA World Cup.

References

External links

Tisir Al-Antaif at playmakerstats.com (English version of ogol.com.br)

1974 births
Living people
People from Dammam
Saudi Arabian footballers
Saudi Arabia international footballers
Association football goalkeepers
Ittihad FC players
1998 FIFA World Cup players
1999 FIFA Confederations Cup players
2000 AFC Asian Cup players
Al-Faisaly FC players
Al-Nahda Club (Saudi Arabia) players
Al-Ahli Saudi FC players
Ettifaq FC players
Khaleej FC players
Saudi First Division League players
Saudi Professional League players
Saudi Arabian Shia Muslims